The Guelph Police Service (GPS) is the police force for the city of Guelph, Ontario. The GPS was formed in 1827 with the founding of the city. The Guelph Police Service is the 14th largest municipal police service in Ontario with 323 members and serves a population of around 150,000. The Chief of Police is Gordon Cobey and the departmental headquarters are located at 15 Wyndham Street South. The force is governed by the Police Services Act of Ontario, under which a five-member civilian "police services board" is responsible for the Guelph Police.

Administration
Nearly 215 sworn police officers and 100 civilian employees make up the Guelph Police Service (2020 report). Each officer must contain several prerequisites and complete a series of application stages in order to reach employment. As of January 2020, there is a new first step in being able to apply for policing in Ontario. Hopeful applicants must complete their OACP testing and receive a certificate in order to be able to apply.
 
The staff of a police service includes various positions and units. Police constable is a position where officers develop relationships through community interaction. Through law enforcement and crime prevention, this position allows officers to ensure public safety. Constable is not the only position, or the only way for the residents of the Guelph region, to fight crime. Several civilian openings are given each year, such as managerial and supportive positions. These job opportunities require specialized skills and knowledge in order to adjust to the ever-changing front-line setting.

The service annually awards valuable contributions with the title of "Member of the Year", "Award for Excellence in Support Services", "Award for Excellence in Criminal Investigation", and "Chief's Commendation for Policing Excellence".

Inquiries and service
In order to perform with efficiency, multiple services have been instituted. Court services, for example, is a unit that is responsible for maintaining a safe environment for all persons inside a court room. The Municipal Freedom of Information and Protection of Privacy Act (MFIPPA) allows all Ontario residents the right to request information held by all police services. This right also necessitates these police services to protect all information including administrative documents and personal intelligence of all Ontario's inhabitants.

GPS branches
 Critical incident response team (CIRT)
 Downtown/tactical team
 Downtown liaison
 Neighbourhood teams
 Canine
 Traffic
 Strike liaison
 Civil emergencies
 Bike patrol
 Crime analyst
 Criminal investigations
 Drugs and intelligence
 Forensic identification
 Communications
 Community relations
 Training

Fleet

 Ford Taurus police interceptor cruisers (marked and unmarked)
 Ford Explorer police interceptor cruisers (marked and unmarked)

 Mobile command unit - converted RV

Past vehicles
 Ford Crown Victoria LTD cruiser
 Chevrolet Caprice cruiser
 Chevrolet Impala cruiser

References

External links
Guelph Police Service official website.

Law enforcement agencies of Ontario
Municipal government of Guelph